Kiehimänjoki is a river of Finland. The river begins from lake Iijärvi in Paltamo in Kainuu region and ends to the lake Oulujärvi, from which the waters flow through the Oulujoki River into the Gulf of Bothnia. The river drains a chain of lakes that originates in the municipalities of Suomussalmi and Hyrynsalmi in Kainuu.

See also
List of rivers in Finland

Rivers of Finland
Ristijärvi
Oulujoki basin